Pandanus acuminatus is a species of plant in the family Pandanaceae. This is a synonym for the accepted name, Pandanus connatus H. St. John.

References 

acuminatus
Plants described in 1878
Taxa named by Isaac Bayley Balfour